Kuraim (also Romanized as Kūrā’īm, Kowrāyem, and Kūraīm) is a city in Kuraim District of Nir County, Ardabil province, Iran. At the 2006 census, its population was 781 in 167 households. The following census in 2011 counted 854 people in 220 households. The latest census in 2016 showed a population of 831 people in 234 households.

References 

Nir County

Cities in Ardabil Province

Towns and villages in Nir County

Populated places in Ardabil Province

Populated places in Nir County